The Comboni Missionaries of the Heart of Jesus, also known as the Comboni Missionaries of the Sacred Heart, or the Verona Fathers, and originally called the Sons of the Sacred Heart of Jesus (Congregatio Filiorum S. Cordis Iesu), is a Catholic clerical male religious congregation of pontifical right.

History

The congregation was founded on 1 June 1867 by Daniele Comboni, who was born into a humble family of laborers. Comboni entered the institute opened in Verona by Nicola Mazza for the education of the poor. Mazza's institute was also involved in the work of evangelization of the territories of Central Africa.

In 1854, Comboni was ordained a priest, and on 14 February 1858, he settled in the Vicariate Apostolic of Central Africa along with five missionary companions. The mission went poorly; the climate was harsh and the missionaries became ill. Some died within a few months, and in 1859 Comboni himself decided to leave Africa and return home.

In Italy, Comboni devised a plan for the rebirth of Africa: convinced of the need to involve the local people in missionary activity, he thought of creating centres for welcoming, baptizing, and educating the natives so they could act as catechists among their own people. He organised conferences all over Europe to share his idea, as well as speaking with Arnold Janssen and Catholic congregations already engaged in missions in Africa.

On the occasion of Vatican Council I, Comboni prepared a document to be presented to the fathers to try to involve as many ecclesial forces in the work of propagating faith in Africa, but because of the suspension of the council, the document could not be discussed.

On 1 June 1867, Comboni decided to open a training center which conducted seminars for clerics in Verona to be used in African missions: as a reference model for the organization of the community, the Paris Foreign Missions Society was chosen as a company of priests and lay brothers, without religious vows, but with an oath of loyalty and belonging to the community. The direction and teaching in the institute were entrusted to the Jesuits.

The missionary society, originally called the Sons of the Sacred Heart of Jesus, was approved as a congregation of diocesan right on 8 December 1871. On 31 July 1877,  Comboni was named Apostolic Vicar  of Central Africa and travelled to Khartoum, where he died in 1881. With the founder's death, his congregation entered a precarious phase: the Mahdist War prevented missionaries from continuing their mission to Sudan.  Francesco Sogaro, Comboni's first successor, transformed the society into a congregation of simple vows in 1885, but older members did not accept the decision because they believed that religious practices would distract the missionaries from the active apostolate. Only the decision of the Sacred Congregation for the Propagation of the Faith, which approved Sogaro's choice, ended the internal conflicts of the institute.

With the Anglo-Egyptian victory over the Mahdists, the Comboni Missionaries could resume their mission to Sudan. The congregation received the Papal Decree of Praise on 7 June 1895. Since the congregation was now mature and self-sufficient, Antonio Maria Roveggio, successor to Sogaro, in 1899 took on the responsibility of formation of new missionaries from the Jesuits. On 19 February 1910, the Holy See finally approved the institute and its constitutions.

Within the congregation, two groups were soon set up: one formed by Italian religious and the other by the religious of the German-speaking countries. The conflicts between the two factions grew in the years of World War I. On 27 July 1923, the Holy See decided to separate the German branch of the institute from the parent congregation by instituting the Missionaries of the Sons of the Sacred Heart of Jesus, which were approved on 18 March 1924.

Vatican II, which had invited religious institutes to rediscover the charism of their founders, urged the two separate congregational groups to seek the way of unity. As a result, on 2 September 1975, together in the town of Ellwangen in southern Germany, the two groups celebrated the general chapters which decided and ratified the meeting of the two institutes. On 22 June 1979, the Holy See sanctioned the union of the two congregations.

The founder, beatified in 1996, was proclaimed a saint by Pope John Paul II on 5 October 2003.

Activity and dissemination

The Comboni Missionaries state that they dedicate themselves to the missionary apostolate to the populations that are not yet or not sufficiently evangelised, especially in Africa.

They are present in Europe (Austria, France, Germany, Ireland, Italy, Poland, Portugal, United Kingdom, Spain), Africa (Benin, Central African Republic, Chad, Democratic Republic of Congo, Ghana, Egypt, Eritrea, Ethiopia, Malawi, Mozambique, South Africa, South Sudan, Sudan, Togo, Uganda, Zambia), in the Americas (Brazil, Canada, Chile, Costa Rica, Ecuador, El Salvador, Guatemala, Mexico, Nicaragua, Peru), and Asia (Philippines, Macao, Taiwan). The Mother House is in Via Luigi Lilio in Rome.

At the end of 2020, the congregation had 272 houses with 1,576 religious, 1,103 of whom were priests.

Sexual abuse

Eleven men have alleged that members of the order sexually abused them during the 1960s and 1970s when they were boys at a Comboni Missionaries minor seminary, St Peter Claver College, in Mirfield, England. One of those abused, Mark Murray, set up a blog, veronafathersmirfield.com, to encourage further testimonies; eventually a group formed. Four abusers were named in the men's statements. In 2014, the order paid a total of £120,000 to the men, while saying "All the claims were made on a purely commercial basis and with no admission of liability". A Comboni Missionaries internal inquiry reported that one of the accused, Father Nardo, "had acted inappropriately". In May 2015, the accusers sent a 157-page report including over 1,000 allegations of abuse over several decades to the archbishops of Britain and Ireland, calling on the Comboni Missionaries to acknowledge the alleged abuse and apologise. Danny Sullivan, chairman of the National Catholic Safeguarding Commission, said that the response of the Combonis reflected "a stark difference of attitude from that of Pope Francis", who had addressed victims of abuse and humbly asked forgiveness, implying that Comboni Fathers had taken a very different approach.

The 2014–2020 Independent Inquiry into Child Sexual Abuse in England and Wales met with victims and complainants, and reported on the experience of the Comboni core participants (victims). The section of the Inquiry's Report on the Comboni Order in November 2020 stated that "The Inquiry has seen a number of instances where abuse was understated or described as 'inappropriate', 'a misdemeanour' or 'misbehaviour'. To describe the sexual abuse of children in such ways is to minimise the appalling acts and the effect on the victims".

In summer 2019 the Comboni Order declined a request to meet with the Comboni core participants, responding: "The Provincial Superior has publicly stated that the Comboni Missionaries are deeply sorry for any suffering experienced by individuals who attended their junior seminary at St Peter Claver College in Mirfield" but that they believed it "best to allow the Inquiry to conclude before they consider any engagement". The Inquiry, quoting this response, clarified that they had "never asked that any institution delay meeting with victims and survivors nor did it do so in respect of the Comboni Order".

In June 2021  Bishop of Leeds Marcus Stock, in a meeting with victims attended by Archbishop of Westminster Cardinal Vincent Nichols and Archbishop Charles Scicluna of Malta, Adjunct Secretary of the Congregation for the Doctrine of the Faith (responsible for dealing with clerical sexual abuse cases), apologised for sexual abuse of boys at the Comboni Missionaries' St Peter Claver College in the 1960s and 1970s. A victim said that the apology was the first time that a senior figure in the church had acknowledged the events. Victims commented that the only time the church had previously engaged with them was through the courts, and that they hoped for a meeting with Pope Francis. The Bishop said that he had not been able to arrange a meeting between the victims and the Comboni Order, and that the Pope was aware the men had not had an "adequate pastoral response" from the leadership of the Comboni Order.

See also

 Comboni Missionary Sisters
 Apostles of Jesus
 Caravan of Peace

References

Bibliography
 
 Mario Escobar (Ed.), Ordini e congregazioni religiose (2 voll.), Società Editrice Internazionale, Torino 1951–1953.

External links

 
 
 
 

1871 establishments in Italy
Catholic Church in Africa
Religious organizations established in 1871
Catholic missionary orders
Catholic religious institutes established in the 19th century
Organisations based in Rome